The Republic of China (ROC), commonly known as Taiwan, has full diplomatic relations with 13 of the 193 United Nations member states and with the Holy See, which governs Vatican City, as of . In addition to these relations, the ROC also maintains unofficial relations with 59 UN member states, one self-declared state (Somaliland), three territories (Guam, Hong Kong, and Macau), and the European Union via its representative offices and consulates under the One China principle. Taiwan has the 31st largest diplomatic network in the world with 110 offices.

Historically, the ROC has required its diplomatic allies to recognise it as the sole legitimate government of "China" (competing for exclusive use of the name "China"), starting in the early 1970s when the ROC was replaced by the PRC as the recognised government of "China" in the UN following Resolution 2758 including its key position such as a permanent membership on the United Nations Security Council. But since the 1990s, its policy has changed into actively seeking dual recognition with the People's Republic of China (PRC). Many international organizations that the ROC participates in use alternative names, including "Chinese Taipei" at the International Olympic Committee.

Historical context
The ROC government participated in the 1943 Moscow Conference, the Dumbarton Oaks Conference, and the United Nations Conference on International Organization and was a charter member of the United Nations after participating in the alliance that won World War II. In 1949, the Nationalists lost the Chinese Civil War in mainland China and retreated to Taiwan, Penghu, Kinmen, and Matsu, forming a rump state. Despite the major loss of territory, the ROC continued to be recognized as the legitimate government of China by the UN and by many non-Communist states.

American foreign policy 1950–1971 called for full recognition and support of the government of China in Taiwan. As the Korean War (1950–1953) broke out, Taiwan was not allowed to send military support to South Korea. However, the Truman Administration resumed economic and military aid to the ROC on Taiwan and neutralized the Taiwan Strait by United States Seventh Fleet to stop a Chinese Communist Party (CCP) invasion as well as a potential ROC's counter-invasion of the mainland. In 1954 a US-Taiwan military alliance was signed as a result of the American Cold War strategy in the Far East, in the determination not to allow Chiang Kai-shek's forces on Taiwan to attack China, thereby setting off another even larger war between the United States and China.

The American military presence in Taiwan consisted of the Military Assistance Advisory Group (MAAG) and the United States Taiwan Defense Command (USTDC). Other notable units included the 327th Air Division. Until the US formally recognized the People's Republic of China in 1979, Washington provided the ROC with financial grants based on the Foreign Assistance Act, Mutual Security Act, and Act for International Development enacted by the US Congress. A separate Sino-American Mutual Defense Treaty was signed between the two governments of US and ROC in 1954 and lasted until 1979.

The US State Department's official position in 1959 was:
That the provisional capital of the Republic of China has been at Taipei, Taiwan (Formosa) since December 1949; that the Government of the Republic of China exercises authority over the island; that the sovereignty of Formosa has not been transferred to China; and that Formosa is not a part of China as a country, at least not as yet, and not until and unless appropriate treaties are hereafter entered into. Formosa may be said to be a territory or an area occupied and administered by the Government of the Republic of China, but is not officially recognized as being a part of the Republic of China.

1971 expulsion from the UN
In 1971, the UN expelled the ROC and transferred China's seat to the People's Republic of China (PRC). In addition to the  recognition of the ROC by a majority of countries before UN Resolution 2758, the ROC lost its membership in all intergovernmental organisations related to the UN. As the UN and related organizations like the International Court of Justice are the most common venues for effective execution of international law and serve as the international community for sovereign states, a majority of the countries aligned with the West in the Cold War terminated diplomatic relations with the ROC and opened diplomatic relations with the PRC.

The United Nations Charter's Articles 23 and 110, in its Chapter II, explicitly refer to the ROC, but the seat of "China" is currently occupied by the PRC. The ROC continues to maintain substantial relations, including with most of the non-governmental organisations at the United Nations, in addition with the concern from UNESCO. The Vienna Convention on Diplomatic Relations was signed and ratified by the ROC on 18 April 1961 and 19 December 1969, including Optional Protocol concerning the Compulsory Settlement of Disputes. It is entitled by the founding of the United Nations as the cornerstone of modern-day diplomacy since the Vienna Congress, Article 35 of 1969 Vienna Convention on the Law of Treaties also applies to the ROC since 1971. Due to the ROC's insecurity and intolerance in the 1970s and 1980s after it was expelled by the UN as well as American influence, the ROC gradually democratized and adopted universal suffrage, ending under the one-party leadership of President Chiang Ching-kuo by lifting 38 years of martial law on the Communist rebellion on Mainland China and establishing the new self-identity of Republic of China (system) on Taiwan in the international community, enacting Two Chinas states in the world. UN Resolution 2758 is non-binding on the international law regarding the international status of the Republic of China on Taiwan, and the ROC continues to seek opportunities to join UN Specialized agencies to become a Permanent Observer under the auspices of UN Resolution 396, which duly recommended the questions of debate on Chinese representation in the United Nations.

Elections
The first direct presidential election was held in 1996, and the incumbent President Lee Teng-hui was elected. As of 4 May 2015, ROC nationals are eligible for preferential visa treatment from 142 countries and areas. In the context of superpower and influential diplomacy, the ROC's traditional and stable allies include United States of America, Canada, Japan, Australia, and New Zealand. The ROC's cultural diplomacy includes the establishment of the Taiwan Resource Center for Chinese Studies in 2012 in major universities around the world.

Development assistance
Since 1950 Taiwan has given high priority to international aid, making its representatives welcome even in states without formal diplomatic relations. The policies provide generous aid without strict accountability conditions, especially in developing nations in Africa, Latin America, and the South Pacific.  Building a reputation as a responsible and generous donor has earned it prestige, especially in contrast to the manipulative role of foreign aid in China's policies, such as the Belt and Road Initiative.

The ROC is one of the main supporters of official development assistance, with the International Cooperation and Development Fund managing ROC's Foreign Assistance and International Cooperation projects. As of 2010, along with other US security allies including Australia, New Zealand, Japan, and South Korea in the Asia-Pacific region with Taiwan Relations Act, officials of the ROC have gained quasi-official level visits to the United States both in the governmental and political level, including the Taiwanese–US cooperative military guidance in the annual Han Kuang joint-force exercises.

Think tanks

Taiwan's political system has evolved in terms of increasing political liberalization. By the 1990s, Taiwan had a democratic system with multiparty competition, factionalism, a vigorous civil society, and many interest groups. Think tanks emerged because of the high prestige of expertise and the heavy demand for unofficial diplomacy necessitated by the loss of formal diplomatic recognition. Think tanks have played a major role in planning and operationalizing relations with countries around the world.

European universities, research centers, and think tanks have developed a new academic field of Taiwan studies, especially in Europe, because of the unique status of Taiwan in the world's diplomatic system. The scholars involved have a deep commitment to Taiwan studies and have developed a Europe-wide network of scholars.

Policies

Economics
The ROC's GDP was ahead of several G20 economies before 2012.

UN specialised agencies
As a non-member state of the United Nations, by participating as members in one or more United Nations Specialised Agencies and operating in a parallel political system with the CCP as in the case of Germany and Korea, the ROC may be granted a Permanent Observer status in organisations such as the IMF and World Bank.

Involvement and participation in the Asia Pacific Innovation Conference allows interaction with the Director of Economics and Statistics Division of WIPO, who directly reports to the Director-General.

International isolation
Due to "the absence of a cross-strait understanding" (1992 consensus), the ROC has encountered international isolation due to political and economic pressure from Mainland China since the 1970s. This isolation has continued under the pro-Taiwan independence administration of the Democratic Progressive Party and Taiwan is not allowed to attend World Health Assembly, Interpol, International Civil Aviation Organisation, United Nations' Kimberley Process Certification Scheme, possible international measures against the activities of Chinese Taipei Olympic Committee, Golden Horse Film Festival and Awards (boycotted), ban on Taiwan's journalist to acquire pass to United Nations and as well as UNFCCC meetings.

The ROC's (multi-sector) civil society currently participates in 11 projects of United Nations Sustainable Development Goals. ROC ranks 31st of 176 countries and territories in the 2016 Transparency International's Corruption Perception Index and is placed in Band B of the Government Defense Corruption Index.

International disputes

In the 1970s many countries switched diplomatic recognition from the ROC to the PRC, including the United States, Japan and Canada. In October 1971, Resolution 2758 was passed by the UN General Assembly, expelling  "the representatives of Chiang Kai-shek" and transferring China's seat on the Security Council to the PRC. The resolution declared that "the representatives of the Government of the PRC are the only lawful representatives of China to the United Nations." However, the eo ipso nature of Taiwan and weapons of mass destruction remained a contentious issue.

Many attempts by the ROC to rejoin the UN have not made it past committee, under fierce PRC opposition and threatened vetoes. President Chen Shui-bian argued that Resolution 2758, replacing the ROC with the PRC in 1971, addressed only the question of who should have China's seat in the UN, rather than whether an additional seat for the Taiwan Area could be created to represent the 23 million people residing in the Taiwanese mainland and other islands.

Since the 1970s, the PRC and ROC have competed for diplomatic recognition from nations across the world, often by offering financial aid to poorer countries as an inducement. As a precondition for diplomatic relations, the PRC requires that the other country renounce any recognition of the ROC. Since the introduction of the "pragmatic diplomacy" policy in 1991, the ROC has not insisted on consideration as the sole representative of China, and does not require nations that recognise it to end their relations with the PRC. For example, when Saint Lucia recognised the ROC in 2007, its leader expressed his hope that Saint Lucia's relations with the PRC would continue. However, the PRC responds to recognitions of the ROC by suspending relations with the other country.

On less official terms, the ROC is involved in a complex dispute for control over the Spratly Islands with China, Malaysia, the Philippines, Vietnam, and Brunei; and over the Paracel Islands, occupied by China, but claimed by Vietnam and by the ROC. The ROC government also claims the Senkaku Islands.

Types of relations

Full diplomatic relations 

 Taiwan maintains full diplomatic relations with 14 sovereign states, 13 of which are member states of the United Nations, whereas the remaining sovereign state is the Holy See (Vatican City), which is a United Nations General Assembly observer state.

Non-diplomatic representation 

A certain number of countries have official diplomatic relations with the PRC but also maintain some form of unofficial diplomatic relations with Taiwan. This number includes 59 sovereign states, 3 dependent or quasi-dependent territories, and the European Union.

Unofficial diplomatic relations typically involve an "Economic, Trade and Cultural Office" in Taiwan for the partner country, as well as a corresponding "Taipei/Taiwan/ROC Representative Office" representing Taiwan within the partner country. These unofficial offices generally function as embassies despite not being officially named as such. For example, the American Institute in Taiwan functions as the United States' de facto embassy, with the chairman and staff acting as unofficial government consulate officers who nevertheless perform duties that official embassies would undertake.

Various countries host Taiwanese representative offices within themselves but don't have representative offices in Taiwan. One country, Luxembourg, has a representative office in Taiwan but does not host a Taiwanese representative office within itself; Taiwan's interests in Luxembourg are served by the Taipei Representative Office in the EU and Belgium. Taiwan also regards the European Union, with which it also has unofficial relations via the Taipei Representative Office in the EU and Belgium, as a state entity in the context of international relations; the EU is a supranational union with a high level of integration between its member states, though each member state retains its national sovereignty.

Taiwan has unofficial diplomatic relations with Hong Kong and Macau, both of which are Special Administrative Regions of the PRC, though Taiwan does not have similar such relations with mainland China (the PRC). Technically, Hong Kong and Macau are integral territories of the PRC, governed under the "One Country, Two Systems" framework. This means that Taiwan effectively has unofficial relations with parts of the PRC but not with the national government of the PRC itself. Taiwan maintains hostile relations with the PRC through the Mainland Affairs Council, whose counterpart is the Taiwan Affairs Office; neither office is considered to be an embassy by either Taiwan or the PRC, and both offices are operated within the home country rather than within the host country.

Taiwan has strong unofficial relations with Somaliland, which is a self-declared state in the Horn of Africa that is claimed as the territory of neighbouring Somalia, in a state of affairs that displays strong parallels to Taiwan's own sovereignty dispute with China.

Taiwan maintains a "Taiwan Economic and Cultural Office" in Guam, which is an external territory of the United States located in Oceania.

In 2021, Lithuania announced that it would open an unofficial representative office in Taiwan, and Taiwan likewise announced that it would open an unofficial representative office in Lithuania. The Lithuania office was due to open by fall (autumn) of 2021 in the Northern Hemisphere, which is essentially September to November inclusive. Relations between Lithuania and the PRC have simultaneously soured.

A certain number of countries have indirect unofficial diplomatic relations with Taiwan via third-party proxy countries. For example, the Taipei Liaison Office in the Republic of South Africa serves the interests of Taiwan throughout a great number of countries in Africa that otherwise don't have any channels of communication with Taiwan.

Asia (20 states and 2 territories)
 
 
  (no direct relations with mainland China)
  (SAR of the PRC)
  (SAR of the PRC)
 
 
 
 
 
 
 
 
 
 
 
 
 
 
 
 
 
 

Europe (23 states and 1 supranational union)

  (Supranational union)
 
 
 
 
 
 
 
 
 
 
 
 
  (Taiwanese office opened in November 2021, first one in the world to adopt the name "Taiwanese").
  (has an office in Taipei, Taipei does not have an office in Luxembourg; representation through Belgium and the EU)
 
 
 
  (has an Economic and Cultural Office in Taipei, Taiwan has Representative Office in Bratislava)
 
 
 
 
 

North America (3 states)
 
 
 

Oceania (4 states and 1 territory)
 
 
  (Territory of the United States)
 
 

South America (6 states)

No representation 
The following states recognise Beijing and have no representation in Taiwan (including any non-political, non-diplomatic, non-intergovernmental representation):

Africa (50 states)
 
 
 
 
 
 
 
 
 
 
 
 
 
 
 
 
 
 
 
 
 
 
 
 
 
 
 
 
 
 
 
 
 
 
 
 
 
 
 
 
 
 
 
 
 
 
 
 
 
 

Asia (25 states)
 
 
 
 
 
 
 
 
 
 
 
 
 
 
 
 
 
 
 
 
 
 
 
 

Europe (21 states)
 
 
 
 
 
 
 
 
 
 
 
 
 
 
 
 
 
 
 
 
 

North America (13 states)
 
 
 
 
 
 
 
 
 
 
 
 
 

Oceania (8 states)
  (Semi-sovereign state in association with New Zealand)
 
 
  (Semi-sovereign state in association with New Zealand)
 
 
 
 

South America (5 states)

Relations with neither the ROC nor the PRC 
A certain number of countries or sovereign entities do not possess full diplomatic relations with either Taiwan or the PRC. This includes eight states with limited recognition, one member state of the United Nations, and one non-territorial sovereign entity (Sovereign Military Order of Malta).

Out of the eight states with limited recognition that do not possess full diplomatic relations with Taiwan, one of them, Somaliland, has strong unofficial relations with Taiwan, while another, Kosovo, has been unilaterally recognised by Taiwan but does not recognise Taiwan in return. The other six states with limited recognition are ignored by Taiwan diplomatically.

The Sovereign Military Order of Malta is a non-territorial sovereign entity; it claims and controls no territory, it does not consider itself to be a state, and yet it considers itself to be sovereign. The Order of Malta maintains full diplomatic relations with 110 sovereign states (including the Holy See), official relations with 5 other sovereign states, and ambassador-level relations with the European Union and the State of Palestine. The Order of Malta does not maintain full diplomatic relations with either Taiwan or the PRC. Even though the Order of Malta doesn't maintain full diplomatic relations with Taiwan, it has been involved in supporting Taiwan's participation in the UN-affiliated World Health Assembly during the COVID-19 pandemic.

Bhutan is the only member state of the United Nations that does not have full diplomatic relations with either Taiwan or the PRC. Taiwan has unilaterally recognised Bhutan's sovereignty.

Relations switched from the ROC to the PRC

Taiwanese academics stated that if any one state switches its diplomatic relations to the PRC, it would create a domino effect, encouraging other states to do so as well. The Holy See (Vatican), the only European state that has diplomatic relations with Taiwan, made efforts in 2007 to create formal ties with the PRC. High-ranking bishops in the Catholic Church have implied that such a diplomatic move was possible, predicated on the PRC's granting more freedom of religion and interfering less in the hierarchy of the Catholic Church in China.

States that have never had diplomatic relations with the ROC but have relations with the PRC

Bribery allegations 
Taiwan has been accused on multiple occasions of bribing foreign politicians to commence or maintain diplomatic relations. The ex-president of Guatemala admitted in a US court taking $2.5m from Taiwan in exchange for continuing to recognize it diplomatically. Regarding Taiwanese "dollar diplomacy" in Vanuatu an observer said: "the methods Taiwan uses, bribing countries and politicians, are unjust, violate international law and disturb the global community. Bribery diplomacy won’t last.” Taiwan has provided Nauruan government ministers with a monthly stipend of $5000 in exchange for continuation of the Pacific island country's diplomatic relations with Taipei. Nauruan politicians, including President Marcus Stephen received secret funds. Other MPs received $2500 a month in what is described as project funding that requires minimal accounting.

History

Taiwan was annexed by Japan in 1895 after the First Sino-Japanese War. In the Northern Expedition, the Nationalists defeated the warlords of the Beiyang clique and established a unified government for China in Nanjing. The United States recognised Republic of China (ROC) on 25 July 1928, the first government to do so. The Japanese occupied much of China during World War II. After Japan's defeat in 1945, Taiwan was placed under the temporary administration of the ROC to handle the surrender of Japanese administration. The Chinese Civil War broke out again between the Nationalists and the CCP. The CCP gained control of the mainland in 1949 and proclaimed the People's Republic of China (PRC), while the Nationalists fled to Taiwan, taking the ROC government with them. In 1952, Japan renounced Taiwan in the Treaty of San Francisco without specifying to whom Taiwan is ceded.

In 2016, A. P. Winston, the author of Chinese Finance under the Republic, said, "chief sources of information on those matters of discussion which have been subjects of diplomacy" were official publications from the United Kingdom. Winston explained that only a few official reports from the Chinese government aside from the maritime customs sector had appeared at that point, and that the government of the ROC was "too poor, perhaps still too secretive, to make regular and full publication of statistics."

During the Cold War the ROC generally maintained an anti-communist stance, however during the late 1960s and early 1970s the government of Chiang Kai-shek undertook secret negotiations with Moscow. Even going so far as having the foreign minister suggest that the ROC would have their own "Warsaw talk" with the Soviets. Throughout the Cold War Wang Sheng was a driving force in diplomacy between the ROC and the anti-communist world.

After retreating there in 1949 Chiang Kai-shek never again left Taiwan, this required leaders who wanted to meet with Chiang to travel to Taiwan. The first head of state during the KMT era to make a state visit abroad was Yen Chia-kan in 1977 when he visited Saudi Arabia.

In September 2016, the Ministry of Foreign Affairs planned to disband fewer than 10 of its embassies to allocate for a "new southbound policy".
 

Since 1990, the ROC has witnessed a net of 10 countries switch recognition to the PRC.

In January 2021 the European Parliament passed two Taiwan related resolutions. The first resolution contained statements of support for Taiwan's democracy. The second encouraged member states to work to "revisit their engagement policies with Taiwan" as well as to work together with international partners to "protect democratic Taiwan from foreign threats."

Bilateral relations

Cross-Strait relations

The Double Tenth Agreement signed on 10 October 1945 is the only legal document between the two parties. The following , was engulfed by Cold War history and the American foreign policy of containment in East Asia after the Korean War. Before the Korean War broke out, the US was preparing for a coup d'état in mid-1950 to replace Chiang Kai-shek with Hu Shih and Sun Li-jen and neutralize the ROC's legal status under UN Trusteeship to block any legal claim of the PRC on Taiwan, as proposed by United States Department of State official Dean Rusk. The Formosa Resolution of 1955 was passed unanimously by the United States Congress. Resolving the cross-Strait relationship required both sides to rethink definitions of basic concepts such as sovereignty, "one China" and unification.

The two polities of accession resulted in the PRC's Campaign to Suppress Counterrevolutionaries, the lifting of its martial law on PRC territory, and more recently the enactment of the PRC's Anti-Secession Law towards the ROC. The two sides have no cross-strait military confidence-building measures (CBM) "to improve military-to-military relations in ways that reduce fears of attack and the potential for military miscalculation". Nuclear tensions have risen since the PRC promulgated the Anti-Secession Law.

Neither Taipei nor Beijing sees their relations as foreign relations. However, the government position that both Taiwan and mainland China are parts of the same state is not universally accepted among the people of Taiwan. In particular, the pro-independence Pan-Green Coalition considers Taiwan and China to be different countries. By contrast, the pro-unification Pan-Blue Coalition take the view that both Taiwan and mainland China are parts of the ROC. Former president Lee Tung-hui described these relations as "Special state-to-state relations". The Chen administrations described Taiwan and China by saying "...with Taiwan and China on each side of the Taiwan Strait, each side is a country.". Former President Ma Ying-jeou returned to the government position of the early 1990s, calling relations with Beijing special relations between two areas within one state. That state, according to Taiwan is the ROC, and due to constitutional reasons, neither Taipei nor Beijing recognises each other as a legitimate government.

The term preferred by Taiwanese and Chinese governments is "cross-strait relations", referring to the geographical separator, the Taiwan Strait. The constitutional position of Taipei is that the territory of the ROC is divided into the "Mainland Area" and the "Free Area" (also known as "Taiwan Area"). Administratively, cross-strait relations are not conducted by the Ministry of Foreign Affairs of Taiwan, but by the Mainland Affairs Council, an instrument of the Executive Yuan. The relations with Hong Kong and Macau are also conducted by the Mainland Affairs Council, although not all regulations applicable to mainland China automatically apply to those territories.

Taiwanese and Chinese governments do not directly interact. Talks are conducted by China's Association for Relations Across the Taiwan Straits (ARATS) and Taiwan's Straits Exchange Foundation (SEF), privately constituted bodies that are controlled and directly answerable to the executive branches of their respective governments.

Until the late 1990s, Hong Kong and Macau were British and Portuguese colonies respectively. They provided neutral detour points for people and goods crossing the strait. They and Singapore served as venues for talks between the two sides at that time. One modus vivendi outcome of such talks was the 1992 Consensus, arising from a 1992 meeting in Hong Kong. Under this consensus, the two sides agree that both Taiwan and mainland China are under the same single sovereignty of China, but the two sides agree to disagree on which side is the legitimate representative of that sovereignty. Setting aside that disagreement, the two sides agreed to co-operate on practical matters, such as recognising certifications authenticated by the other side.

Relations between Taipei and Beijing warmed during the Ma government with the promotion of cross-strait links and increased economic and social interchanges between the two sides, but the 2014 local elections cooled them again. A high-level meeting was held on 11 February 2014 in Nanjing that marked the first time China recognised Taiwan's top government officials on matters across the Taiwan Strait. The thawed tensions were not welcomed by the Pan-Green Coalition for the Taiwan independence movement after the 2000 presidential election and to the ex injuria jus non-oritur basis of the Anti-Secession Law. A meeting was held on 7 November 2015 between presidents Xi and Ma to affirm the 1992 Consensus before the ROC 2016 general election and in the midst of US Navy tests of area sea claims. Following the election, Beijing cut off contact with the main Taiwan liaison body because of President Tsai Ing-wen's refusal to endorse the concept of a single Chinese nation.

Arab world

Egypt maintained relations until 1956, when Gamal Abdel Nasser cut off relations and recognised the PRC. Ma Bufang, who was then living in Egypt, was ordered to move to Saudi Arabia, and became the ROC ambassador to Saudi Arabia. Saudi Arabia ended its diplomatic relations with the ROC in 1990. Ambassador Wang Shi-ming was a Chinese Muslim, and the ROC ambassador to Kuwait. The ROC also maintained relations with Libya and Saudi Arabia.

Africa

South Africa switched in 1998. Liberia recognised the ROC in 1989, and switched back to the PRC in October 2003.

In December 2016, the government of São Tomé and Príncipe switched.

Burkina Faso has recognised the ROC since 1994, but cut diplomatic ties in May 2018, establishing relations with the PRC. Earlier, Burkina Faso had rejected US$50 billion from China to break ties with Taiwan.

Eswatini 

After Burkina Faso cut relations with Taiwan in 2018, Eswatini became Taiwan's sole ally in Africa. Taiwan has an embassy in Mbabane, Eswatini. On 7 June 2016, the National Police Agency and Royal Eswatini Police Service signed a joint, cross-border, crime fighting pact, which included exchanges, probes, personnel visits, professional skills enhancement, law enforcement and technical assistance. King Mswati III has visited Taiwan seventeen times as of June 2018, and has promised to continue recognising Taiwan instead of the PRC. As of June 2018, the Taiwanese Ambassador is Thomas Chen.

The Gambia

The Gambia recognised the ROC from 1968 until 1974, and then again from 1995 until 14 November 2013, when President Yahya Jammeh's office announced it had cut diplomatic ties with immediate effect. During this era Taiwan gave hundreds of millions of dollars in aid and loans to The Gambia, much of which was diverted by President Yahya Jammeh and those close to him. The PRC recognised The Gambia on 17 March 2016. Upon Gambian recognition the PRC immediately began to furnish them with aid. The repeated switch off between PRC and ROC recognition is seen as an example of checkbook diplomacy.

Americas

Dominican Republic 

On 1 May 2018, the Dominican Republic switched. The government initially gave no reason, although it later said in the switchover ceremony that Taiwan was an inalienable part of China and that the switchover was to comply to the one-China policy. It was motivated by loans and investments worth US$3.1 billion. "History and socioeconomic reality" were cited as reasons for the switchover. Flavio Darío Espinal, a government executive, said that "In the following months and years, enormous opportunities for cooperation will gradually open up, not only in the commercial area, but also in the financial, technological, tourist, educational or energy fields. To take just one example, more than 135 million Chinese tourists visit international destinations annually. The establishment of these diplomatic relations will allow part of that tourism to flow into our country in the near future. And that is just one of the things that will improve."

El Salvador
On 20 August 2018, El Salvador broke ties with Taiwan and established them with the PRC. El Salvador now only recognises the PRC. Just like Panama and the Dominican Republic, the event was broadcast nationwide on radio and television. Hours before the announcement, Taiwan (ROC) announced that it had broken ties with El Salvador, citing the imminent establishment of diplomatic and commercial ties with the PRC (China). El Salvador's president said that his government had decided to make the switchover due to UN Resolution 2758. In response, US Senator Marco Rubio said that El Salvador's decision was a terrible one and threatened to cut off funding for El Salvador. Rubio also said that the switchover could have been influenced by a promise (by the CCP) to help fund the current ruling political party in El Salvador to win again the elections there.

Guatemala
On 18 March 2014, Guatemala's former president Alfonso Portillo pled guilty in the Federal District Court in Manhattan to a charge that he accepted bribes in exchange for recognising the ROC. President Pérez Molina said that Guatemala's relations with the ROC were and are strong and that the Portillo confession would not affect diplomatic relations between the two nations. Taiwan's Ministry of Foreign Affairs declined comment.

Haiti

Haiti currently recognises the Republic of China over the People's Republic of China. In 2018, Taiwan offered a US$150 Million loan for Haiti's power grid in a bid to maintain diplomatic ties with the country once its neighbour, Dominican Republic severed ties with Taiwan along with Burkina Faso. In 2018, Haiti's president visited Taiwan to discuss economic issues and diplomatic relations.

Honduras

In 2021, it was reported the new Honduras Government elected in the 2021 Honduran general election led by the Liberty and Refoundation party was considering recognizing China. On 15 March 2023, the president Xiomara Castro said she has instructed her foreign minister to establish official relations with the PRC. 

Taiwanese leadership criticized Honduras' transition by urging them not to "fall into China's debt trap". Honduras' foreign minister Eduardo Enrique Reina stated that the country had asked Taiwan to double its annual aid and renegotiate its debt to the island, which went unanswered. Taiwan's foreign ministry disputed this, stating that they were still actively engaged in bilateral talks with Honduras' government.

Panama

On 13 June 2017, the government of Panama switched, breaking all ties with the ROC. Panamanians studying in Taiwan were given the choice of returning to Panama within 30 days or continuing their studies in China. Panama was motivated by promises of multibillion-dollar investments.  The shift of recognition began with a letter sent in 2015 to the Chinese government that, according to Isabel Saint Malo, Panama's vice president, was titled "Panama wants to make ties with China". The contents of the letter have been kept confidential, as well as the reasons why it was sent. It has also been kept confidential who delivered the letter and assisted in the switchover process, a person described only as "a distinguished member of the Chinese community living in Panama".

The US ambassador to Panama, John D. Feeley, said that he had asked Panamanian President Juan Carlos Varela about the switchover in 2016 but Varela lied to him, saying that there were no plans to make the switchover. Feeley also said that Varela didn't tell him the truth until one hour before the nationwide announcement.

Others questioned why the Panamanian government continues to use equipment donated by Taiwan. The Panamanian government initially gave no reason, later saying that one reason was because "China is the second largest user of the Panama Canal" and President Varela said it was because he "couldn't accept it anymore" and "that's what every responsible leader would do". The Panamanian government officially said that Taiwan was an inalienable part of China and that the switchover was to comply with the one-China policy. The ROC government said that Panama was its "number one ally" and that it would not participate in Beijing's checkbook diplomacy. The Taiwanese government complained that Panama maliciously hid the switchover process until the last moment.

A Panamanian government agency later said that the switchover was because of Taiwanese president Tsai Ing-wen's violations and lack of regard to the 1992 consensus regarding China, Taiwan and the One-china policy. Panamanian newspaper La Estrella questioned the reasons Varela initially gave for the switchover, like "China has the world's largest population and the 2nd largest economy and user of the Panama Canal"; La Estrella called Varela's actions contradictory and said that the reasons Varela gave were the reality Panama has lived under for decades, so those couldn't be regarded as valid reasons for the switchover. The same newspaper also says that China's plans in Latin America convince Latin American nations easily, with apparent benefits in the short term but with dependency on China in the long term and that China is silently invading other countries and Latin America in general. There are also concerns that, in the long term, Chinese investments may control the Panamanian economy.

In the first year of diplomatic relations, 19 treaties were signed, including a Free Trade Treaty. Varela said that its main purpose was to allow Chinese nationals to easily invest in Panama. Controversies over the sudden switchover included lack of due process, unusually high levels of confidentiality, and the fact that a few weeks before the switchover, Taiwan had donated medical equipment to Panama. In 2018, the first flight from Beijing to Panama by Air China landed at Tocumen International Airport, with a technical stop in Houston. Varela called it a milestone in Panamanian aviation. Due to this new route, the Panamanian ministry of tourism expected at least 40,000 Chinese tourist visits per year. "History and socioeconomic reality" were later cited as reasons for the switchover. Varela said that the move was backed by diplomatic relationships dating from 1912 and that the move strengthened the existing relationships, despite the fact that those relationships were with the ROC, not the PRC. As a result, Panama City was almost immediately added to China's list of officially approved tourist destinations. The CCP government has offered the Panameñista Party-led government a free feasibility study for the planned 4th set of locks in the Panama Canal to gain a competitive advantage in bids for choosing the company to build the 4th set of locks, not to mention plans for a 1,200 hectare industrial park on the Pacific coast and a 4-hectare campus in Amador near the Biomuseo to house the PRC embassy in Panama. There are also fears that Panama could turn into a conflict zone between the US and the PRC, due to Panama's strategic location.

Paraguay

Paraguay recognizes Taiwan. Paraguayan leader General Alfredo Stroessner was a partner of Generalissimo Chiang. Many Paraguayan officers trained in Fu Hsing Kang College in the ROC.

Stroessner's 1989 ousting and his successor Andrés Rodríguez's reinventing himself as a democratically elected president, were immediately followed by invitations from Beijing to switch diplomatic recognition. However, the Taiwanese ambassador, Wang Sheng, and his diplomats were able to convince the Paraguayans that continuing the relationship with the ROC, and thus keeping the ROC's development assistance and access to the ROC's markets, would be more advantageous for Paraguay.

United States

The ROC and the US signed a formal treaty of commerce and navigation in 1948. ROC passport holders can thus be granted an E1 and E2 Visa, with indefinite renewal status, based on continued operation of their enterprise in the US. In 1979 the US recognised the PRC instead of ROC. Commercial (such as Trade and Investment Framework Agreement signed in 1994, TIFA), cultural and other substantial relations are currently governed, inter alia, by the 1979 Taiwan Relations Act. The Act does not recognise the terminology of "Republic of China".  United States policy does not support or oppose Taiwan's independence; instead US policy takes a neutral position of “non-support” for Taiwan's independence.

US Deputy Assistant Secretary of State Alex Wong officially visited the ROC in March 2018 to protest the amendment of the PRC Constitution that removed Presidential tenure restrictions. In July 2002, Minister of Justice Chen Ding-nan became the first Taiwanese government official to be invited to visit the White House after the switch.

While the US acknowledged PRC's One China Policy in 1979, it did not accept the PRC's claim on Taiwan. The unofficial name "Taiwan" was mentioned in the Three Communiqués between the United States and China. Consistent with the United States' One China policy, raising the ROC flag on an official government facility's property within US territory is not approved by the US.

Taiwanese passport holders are included in the US Visa Waiver Program for a stay of 90 days.

After 1979, the US-Taiwan Business Council continued to facilitate commercial activity (mostly semiconductor technology related) and arms sales service. The United States House of Representatives added an amendment to the fiscal year 2016 US defense budget that includes a clause urging the ROC's participation in the biennial Rim of the Pacific (RIMPAC) exercise. The United States State Department has close bilateral cooperation with the ROC through Bureau of Educational and Cultural Affairs' Fulbright Program.

Recent disputes between the US and the ROC include the ROC's ban on the import of US beef and US pork, which was resolved after the ROC adopted the new standard of a maximum residue limit for ractopamine in both beef and pork.

In 2007, a measure was introduced into the United States Congress that would dramatically strengthen US ties with the ROC. The United States House of Representatives passed a resolution calling for the lifting of curbs on visits by high-ranking or top ROC officials. The Resolution noted that "whenever high-level visitors from the ROC, including the President, seek to come to the United States, their requests result in a period of complex, lengthy and humiliating negotiations."  It further said: "Lifting these restrictions will help bring a friend and ally of the United States out of its isolation, which will be beneficial to peace and stability in the Asia-Pacific Region."

A bill was introduced to back the ROC's request to join the UN. The bill stated that the ROC and its 23 million people "deserve membership in the United Nations" and that the United States should fulfill a commitment "to more actively support Taiwan's membership in appropriate international organizations." The bill was introduced on 8 November 2007. The move was led by New Jersey Representative Scott Garrett.

Unofficial diplomatic relations are nevertheless maintained on both sides by means of de facto embassies, which are technically "private organizations" staffed and funded by the respective State Departments. The ROC's de facto embassy network is the Taipei Economic and Cultural Representative Office (TECRO) with offices in Washington, D.C., 12 other US cities and many other countries without official ties. The US' analogous organization is the American Institute in Taiwan (AIT).  As of 2010, officials of the ROC had made quasi-official level US visits at a governmental and political level.

The US State Department in July 2019 approved the selling of 108 M1A2T Abrams tanks and 250 Stinger missiles to Taiwan. The US Defense Security Cooperation Agency said that the arms sale serves "US national, economic, and security interests by supporting" Taiwan's "continuing efforts to modernize its armed forces and to maintain a credible defensive capability."

In August 2019, the Trump administration officially announced arms sale to Taiwan, worth $8 billion, which includes the latest Lockheed Martin-built 66 new F-16C/D fighter jets. China immediately criticized the deal, citing it as detrimental to its sovereignty and interests.

On 9 August 2020, US Secretary of Health and Human Services Alex Azar arrived in Taiwan. It marked the highest-level US official visit to Taiwan since 1979. As retaliation, the Chinese force jets flew over the mid-line of the Taiwan Strait, which is in the air defense identification zone. The visit was also the highest profile visit since the introduction of Taiwan Travel Act.

In August 2022, the US House Speaker, Nancy Pelosi visited the island, an act that was strongly condemned by China.

Venezuela

In 2007, the Venezuelan government refused to renew visas for five members of the ROC commercial representation in Caracas.

Relations with Venezuela have worsened because of the increasing partnership between the socialist government of Hugo Chávez and the People's Republic of China, which has led to a more overt rejection of the Taiwan's legitimacy by Venezuela. During the 2019 Venezuelan presidential crisis, Taiwan has been supportive of Juan Guaidó and the opposition-led National Assembly.

Asia

Bangladesh

Bangladesh has had limited bilateral exchanges with the ROC since it declared independence in 1971. Bangladesh is the ROC's second largest South Asian trading partner in spite of a global slump. Bangladesh mainly exports garments, knitwear, jutes, leathers and handicrafts to the ROC and imports an assortment of textiles, machines, electronics, steels, and plastic.

India

Leadership meetings between ROC and India were carried out in the early 1940s before Indian independence from Great Britain. The ROC is included in India's Look East policy. Bilateral relations between India and the ROC improved starting from the 1990s, despite the absence of official diplomatic relations. India recognises only the PRC. However, economic and commercial links as well as people-to-people contacts have expanded. Like the PRC, the ROC disputes the Chinese border with India over Arunachal Pradesh. The ROC Constitution declares this area a part of South Tibet, and disputes the validity of the McMahon Line.

Iran

On 1 June 1920, a friendship agreement was signed between the ROC and Iran. Ratifications were exchanged on 6 February 1922, with effect on the same day. These relations came to an end in 1971 as Iran recognised Beijing. During Iran-Iraq war Taiwan was one of the only few countries that solely supported Iran. Iran and Taiwan have a significant relationship in commerce and Taiwan imports a significant amount of its oil from Iran. An Iranian newspaper in December 2022 wrote on its front-page that Taiwan has a “legal right” to independence.<ref>{{cite web|url=https://www.taipeitimes.com/News/front/archives/2022/12/15/2003790744 |title=Text Taiwan has right to independence: Iranian newspaper,15 December 2022}}</ref>

Israel

Due to the One China policy, Israel and Taiwan do not have formal diplomatic relations but each has a representative office in the other country and in practice the two countries have friendly relations. There is considerable contact in the areas of science and technology, including military technology.

Japan

Japan–Taiwan relations are guided by the 1972 Japan–China Joint Communiqué. Japan has maintained non-governmental, working-level relations with Taiwan ever since.

Korea

The ROC recognised the Provisional Government of the Republic of Korea in 1919 and the formal establishment of the First Republic of Korea in 1948 and considers the ROK government as the sole legitimate representative of the Korean Peninsula. Due to its anti-communist stance, the ROC does not recognise the Democratic People's Republic of Korea as a state.

On 4 January 1949, the ROC set up an embassy in Myeongdong in Seoul. On 23 August 1992 the ROK severed diplomatic relations with the ROC and then established diplomatic relations with the PRC as part of its Nordpolitik, the last Asian country to switch. In 1991 in the last months of the Cold War, Beijing and Seoul have established ROK and PRC liaisons prior to this and later turned embassies.

ROC Premier Lai Ching-te approved a total ban on trade between the ROC and the DPRK in September 2017. Taiwanese businessmen have been accused of selling coal, oil and gas to North Korea, as well as importing North Korean textiles and employing North Koreans in Taiwanese fishing vessels.

Malaysia

Relations are conducted on an unofficial level. Kuala Lumpur adopted a one-China policy in 1974, recognising the PRC. Malaysia operates a trade centre office in Taipei, and the ROC has an economic and cultural office in Kuala Lumpur.

Mongolia

Until 1945, Nationalist China claimed sovereignty over Mongolia, but under Soviet pressure and as part of the Sino-Soviet Treaty of Friendship and Alliance of August 1945, it recognised Mongolian independence. In 1953, due to the deterioration of diplomatic relations with the Soviet Union, it revoked this recognition and resumed considering it a part of China.Times, MOI rethinks Mongolia, 20 August 2002, p. 2 . Retrieved 2 June 2009

On 3 October 2002, the Ministry of Foreign Affairs recognised Mongolia as an independent country, although no legislative actions were taken to address concerns over its constitutional claims to Mongolia. A Taipei Economic and Cultural Representative Office was opened in Ulaanbaatar, and Taipei excluded Mongolia from the definition of the "mainland area" for administrative purposes. In 2006, old laws regulating the formation of banners and monasteries in Outer Mongolia were repealed. Offices established to support Taipei's claims over Outer Mongolia, such as the Mongolian and Tibetan Affairs Commission, are dormant. However, the official borders of the ROC have not been changed. The official status of recognition is currently ambiguous, though in practice Mongolia is treated as an ordinary foreign power.

Philippines

The Philippines recognises the One China Policy, but has relations with the ROC through the Manila Economic and Cultural Office in Taipei and the Taipei Economic and Cultural Office in Manila. Both offices were established in 1975 and were organized as non-profit corporations. The Philippines is the focal country for the ROC's 2016–2020 Southbound Policy, where the ROC plans to push for greater ties. The push was initially welcomed by the Aquino Administration, however, the Duterte Administration was elected in May 2016, complicating the issue as President Duterte was seen as 'pro-China', and thus would prefer better ties with the mainland over Taiwan. Political analysts during a forum in Manila said that ties between the Philippines and the ROC would have been the best coalition in the Far East, if the South China Sea territorial disputes between the two nations did not exist. The Philippines supports the ROC's membership in UNESCO.

Russia

In the Chinese Civil War, the Soviet Union had a tumultuous yet strategic relationship with the Kuomintang-led Nationalist China until 1949. In the Second Taiwan Strait Crisis of 1958, Soviet leader Nikita Khrushchev recommended the internationalization of the Taiwan Question and appealed to the United Nations and other multilateral organizations to intervene. The Communist Party of the Soviet Union called for the Ten Nations Summit in New Delhi to discuss the issue on 27 September 1958 as one of the precursors of the later Sino-Soviet split. Since the formation of the Russian Federation, Taiwan has exported many ferric materials to Russia in 2004–2005. In 2005, the total amount of the trade between the two economies was $2,188,944,473. Russia has a representative office in Taipei, and ROC has a representative office in Moscow. Russia keeps a positive balance in its trade relations with Taiwan mainly from crude oil, cast iron and steel, nonferrous metals, petrochemical products, ferroalloys, coking coal, timber, and chemical fertilizers. Russia imports mostly electronics and electronic parts, computers and computer parts, and home appliances. The two countries established unofficial diplomatic relations between 1993 and 1996. Taipei is targeting Russia for exporting opportunities and marketing potential.

Singapore

Singapore maintained unofficial relations with both the ROC and the PRC until 1992. It was decided in the Second Ministerial Meeting of APEC as chaired by Singapore in 1990 for the inclusion of the ROC commencing with the Third Ministerial Meeting in Seoul. After the establishment of diplomatic ties between Singapore and PRC on 3 October 1992, Singapore maintained close economic and military ties with Taiwan as part of its attempt to position itself as a neutral party. A diplomatic row broke out between China and Singapore when Lee Hsien Loong visited Taiwan one month before he was sworn in as the Prime Minister of Singapore. Singapore's Ministry of Defence moved to correct an erroneous report in the Liberty Times on a joint military exercise between the Singapore and Taiwan in March 2005. Singapore is the only foreign country to maintain military training camps in Taiwan, and continues to regularly send infantry, artillery, and armoured personnel there for training. The PRC has offered to support relocating some or all of these facilities to Hainan. On the issue of United Nations participation for Taiwan, George Yeo and Mark Chen, the two countries' Foreign Ministers at the time, engaged in a heated exchange of views in 2004 between Beijing's insistence that FTA can only be concluded among sovereign states complicates matters for Taiwan. Accordingly, Singapore and Taiwan signed the "Agreement between Singapore and the Separate Customs Territory of Taiwan, Penghu, Kinmen and Matsu on Economic Partnership (ASTEP)" in November 2013.

Vietnam

Taiwan–Vietnam relations are conducted on an unofficial level, as Hanoi adheres to a one-China policy and officially recognises the PRC only. However, this has not stopped bilateral visits and significant flows of migrants and investment capital between the ROC and Vietnam. The ROC is an important foreign direct investment partner to Vietnam.

Other than the PRC itself, Vietnam is the only communist country that maintains an unofficial relationship with the ROC.

Oceania

The ROC maintains diplomatic relations with four countries in Oceania: the Marshall Islands, Nauru, Palau and Tuvalu. China has relations with eight others (including Australia, Papua New Guinea, Vanuatu, New Zealand, Solomon Islands and Fiji). The Pacific is an area of intense and continuous diplomatic competition between Beijing and Taipei, with several countries (Nauru, Kiribati, Vanuatu, Solomon Islands) having switched diplomatic support from one to the other at least once. Both the PRC and the ROC provide development aid to their respective allies. In exchange, ROC allies support its membership bid in the United Nations. The ROC is one of Tuvalu and Nauru's most important economic partners.

History
In September 2006, the first regional summit of Taiwan's Pacific Island allies took place, hosted by Palau in Koror City. The meeting brought together President Chen and delegates from the Marshall Islands, Tuvalu, Nauru, Palau, Solomon Islands and Kiribati. It was to become a regular event, known as the Taiwan–Pacific Allies Summit."What Really Counts" , Taiwan Review (government website), 30 November 2006 A second regional meeting was hosted by the Marshall Islands in October, and President Chen attended. This resulted in the Majuro Declaration, in which Taiwan's six Pacific allies re-stated their recognition of the ROC's sovereignty, and promised to support the ROC's attempts to join the United Nations.

In June 2007, the ROC donated an aid package of €700,000, distributed among eight Pacific regional organisations.

In January 2008, following the victory of the Kuomintang in the ROC's elections, Kuomintang MP Yang Li-huan stated that under the new government Taiwan's interest in the Pacific could decrease. Three days later, however, it was confirmed that ROC Vice-president Annette Lu would lead a diplomatic visit to the Marshall Islands, Nauru and Solomon Islands.

In March 2008, President-elect Ma was reported as saying that his government would put an end to Taiwanese "cheque-book diplomacy" in the Pacific (or more specifically, similar to the condition of cestui que use diplomacy). In May of that same year, Ma called for what he referred to as a "cease-fire" in the competition between the ROC and the PRC for diplomatic allies. This followed a scandal due to allegations that Taiwan's Foreign Minister James Huang had attempted to buy Papua New Guinea's diplomatic allegiance."Taiwan foreign minister resigns over diplomatic blunder" , Jonathan Adams,International Herald Tribune, 6 May 2008 Papua New Guinea's foreign minister Sam Abal subsequently confirmed that his country had no intention of recognising the ROC.

In October, Taiwan cancelled a scheduled summit with its Pacific Island allies. Although the authorities cited "preparation problems", Radio Australia commented that "the decision appears to be an attempt by the new administration of President Ma Ying-jeou to keep the island's diplomatic activities low-profile and avoid offending China". In June 2009, the Ministry of Foreign Affairs announced that President Ma would "attend a [...] leadership summit between Taiwan and its South Pacific allies" in autumn. The summit, hosted by Solomon Islands, would be attended by the "heads of state of Taiwan's six allies in the region" and would focus on "countering the current economic contraction, climate change and how to strengthen the fisheries industry". Upon announcing the summit, the Ministry added that Ma had "developed a fondness for the Pacific region during his previous visit to Solomon Islands when he saw a handful of children at a market selling betel nuts and watermelons while wearing shirts donated by the people of Taiwan".

In July 2009, the ROC donated over €40,000 in a scholarship scheme benefiting students from Pacific countries, including those, such as Fiji or Papua New Guinea, that do not grant it diplomatic recognition. It donated €288,000 for regional development assistance programmes, to be used notably on access to water, sanitation and hygiene, renewable energy, solar photovoltaic assessments, fisheries management, education and youth training.

Taiwan has asked to be recognised as an official dialogue partner of the Pacific Islands Forum. That status is currently awarded to the PRC.

Australia

In February 2008, Australia reportedly "chastised Taiwan for its renewed push for independence" and "reiterated its support for a one-China policy". Australia-Taiwan relations are growing in non-political areas including an annual Bilateral Economic Consultation and both sides also established Joint Energy, Mineral, Trade and Investment Cooperation Consultation (JEMTIC) as well as an Agriculture Working Group meeting. Australia does not object Taiwan's participation in international organizations where consensus has been achieved, and Australia-Taiwan relations are commercially and unofficially-driven, such as the Australia-Taiwan Business Council, along with contacts in education, science, sports and arts.

Taiwan is unofficially represented in Australia by the Taipei Economic and Cultural Office in Canberra (which has branches in Sydney, Melbourne and Brisbane) while Australia is similarly represented by the Australian Office in Taipei. Taiwan has an official, government co-sponsored branch office of Taiwan External Trade Development Council in Sydney. The Australian Consulate-General in Hong Kong is responsible for Visa and Citizenship matters for applicants in Taiwan. Perth has sister city relations with Taipei City and Brisbane has sister city relations with Kaohsiung City.

Fiji
The ROC set up a trade mission in Fiji in 1971. In 1975, PRC established diplomatic relation with Fiji. The trade center became the Trade Mission of the ROC to the Republic of Fiji in 1988. In 1996, ROC and Fiji signed a 'mutual recognition' communique and Fiji set up its representative office named Fiji Trade and Tourism Representative Office in 1997 in Taipei. The Fiji office closed on 10 May 2017.

Kiribati

Kiribati, under the government of President Taneti Mamau, initially recognised the ROC but switched to PRC later on.

From 1980 to 2003, Kiribati recognised the PRC. Relations between China and Kiribati then became a contentious political issue within Kiribati. President Teburoro Tito was ousted in a parliamentary vote of no confidence in 2003, over his refusal to clarify the details of a land lease that had enabled Beijing to maintain a satellite-tracking station in the country since 1997, and over Chinese ambassador Ma Shuxue's acknowledged monetary donation to "a cooperative society linked to Tito". In the ensuing election, Anote Tong won the presidency after "stirring suspicions that the station was being used to spy on US installations in the Pacific". Tong had previously pledged to "review" the lease.

In November 2003, Tarawa established diplomatic relations with Taipei and Beijing severed its relations with the country. For the PRC, the presence of the satellite-tracking station had made relations with Kiribati relatively important; the station had, in particular, been used to track Yang Liwei's spaceflight. Therefore, for three weeks the PRC called upon I-Kiribati President Anote Tong to break off relations with Taiwan and re-affirm his support for the "One China" policy. Only after those three weeks did the PRC sever relations, thereby losing the right to maintain its satellite-tracking base. The ROC began providing economic aid to Kiribati, while Kiribati began supporting Taiwan in the United Nations.

In 2004, President Tong said he believed the PRC was trying to influence his country. The comment was mainly due to the PRC's refusal to remove all its personnel from its closed embassy. Tong stated that the Chinese personnel, who remained in Kiribati against his wishes, were handing out anti-government pamphlets; he told New Zealand journalist Michael Field: "I am sure if we did this in Beijing, we would be in jail in half a second". Tong's brother and main political opponent, Harry Tong, responded by accusing Taiwan of excessive influence on Kiribati, notably of influencing the country's clergy.

In 2008, Taiwan settled Kiribati's unpaid bills to Air Pacific, enabling the airline to maintain its services from Tarawa to Kiritimati.

In November 2010, despite their lack of diplomatic relations, the PRC was one of fifteen countries to attend the Tarawa Climate Change Conference in Kiribati, and one of twelve to sign the resulting Ambo Declaration on climate change. On 20 September 2019, Kiribati switched diplomatic relation from ROC to PRC.

Marshall Islands

The Marshall Islands recognise the ROC and maintain an embassy in Taipei. The magazine Islands Business reported that President Litokwa Tomeing, elected in January 2008, might turn instead to the PRC. However, in office Tomeing expressed continued support for ties with Taiwan and met with ROC Vice President Annette Lu when she visited the Marshall Islands on 29 January 2008.

Micronesia
Micronesia recognized the Republic of China until 1989, switching its foreign recognition to the People's Republic of China. In 2023, shortly before his term as president ended, David Panuelo wrote an open letter accusing Beijing of bribing Micronesian officials for recognition and to stay out of a potential conflict, as well as spying on the Micronesian government and personally surveilling him. He furthermore advocated for returning to relations with the Republic of China and held meetings with Taiwanese foreign minister Joseph Wu to determine if it was possible.

Nauru

Nauru, under the government of President Baron Waqa, recognises the ROC.

In 1980, Nauru established official relations with the ROC. In 2002, however, the government of René Harris established relations with the PRC, and adopted the One China Policy. Consequently, Taiwan severed its relations with Nauru, and accused the PRC of having bought Nauru's allegiance with financial aid of over €90,000,000. A reporter for The Age agreed, stating that "Beijing recently bought off a threat by Nauru to revert to Taiwan only six months after opening ties with the mainland, offering a large loan to Nauru's near-destitute Government".

In 2003, Nauru closed its newly established embassy in Beijing. Two years later, ROC President Chen met Nauruan President Ludwig Scotty in the Marshall Islands. In May 2005, the ROC and Nauru re-established diplomatic relations, and opened embassies in each other's capitals. The PRC consequently severed its relations with Nauru.

The ROC is one of Nauru's two foremost economic aid partners (with Australia). In return, Nauru uses its seat in the United Nations to support the ROC's admittance proposal. Taiwan provides regular medical assistance to Nauru, sending specialised doctors to the country's only hospital.

In 2007, Scotty was re-elected, amidst claims that his electoral campaign had been funded by Taiwan. Scotty's opponents claimed that the ROC wanted to ensure that a pro-Taiwan government remained in power. Scotty was replaced by Marcus Stephen in December 2007. Following Stephen's election, President Chen telephoned him to congratulate him, assure him of the ROC's continued assistance for Nauru, request Nauru's continued support in return, and invite him to visit Taiwan.

Nauru remains the focus of diplomatic competition between Beijing and Taipei. In 2006, according to the New Statesman, President Scotty "was allegedly accosted by a horde of screaming Chinese officials who tried to drag him on to a plane to Beijing just as he was boarding one bound for Taipei".

In 2008, Nauru co-submitted a proposal to the United Nations, requesting that the United Nations General Assembly consider enabling "Taiwan's participation in the activities of UN specialized agencies". The proposal was rejected.

In 2011 WikiLeaks revealed that Taiwan had been paying a "monthly stipend" to Nauruan government ministers in exchange for their continued support, as well as a smaller sum to other members of parliament, as "project funding that requires minimal accounting". Reporting on the story, the Brisbane Times wrote: "One MP reportedly used his Taiwanese stipend to buy daily breakfast for all schoolchildren in his district, while others were happy to just pocket the cash". A "former Australian diplomat with close knowledge of politics in Nauru" stated that Nauruan President Marcus Stephen, Foreign Minister Kieren Keke and former President Ludwig Scotty, among others, had all accepted "under the counter" funding from Taiwan. The leaks revealed that "Chinese [PRC] agents had also sought to influence Nauru's elections through cash payments to voters, with at least $40,000 distributed in one instance in 2007".

WikiLeaks also revealed that Australia had, at one time, been "pushing" Nauru to break its relations with Taiwan and establish relations with the PRC instead. Then President Scotty had reportedly resisted on the grounds that it was "none of Australia's business".

In late 2011, Taiwan "doubled its health aid" to Nauru, notably providing a resident medical team on a five-year appointment.

In 2018, a diplomatic row between the PRC and Nauru occurred at the Pacific Islands Forum when Nauruans would only stamp entry visas on personal passports of Mainland diplomats rather than diplomatic ones.

New Zealand
While New Zealand does not have formal diplomatic relations with Taiwan, the two countries still maintain informal trade, economic, and cultural relations . Taiwan has two Economic and Cultural offices in Auckland and Wellington. New Zealand also has a Commerce and Industry Office in Taipei.

On 10 July 2013, New Zealand and ROC signed a bilateral Economic Cooperation Agreement.

Palau

Palau recognises the ROC, and is one of the few countries to maintain an embassy in Taipei. Diplomatic relations began in 1999, five years after Palaun independence. ROC maintains an embassy in Koror City. The ROC provides scholarships to Palauan students, as well as computers for Palauan schools. In 2008, Mario Katosang, Palau's Minister of Education, stated:

Travel from the Mainland to Palau is illegal.

Taiwan and Palau entered into a maritime cooperation agreement in March 2019. Taiwan agreed to fund the building of an eight-ton patrol boat in Palau. The agreement also allows Taiwanese patrol boats to resupply in Palau, personnel exchanges, and joint training. The first joint exercise occurred on 23 March when the Taiwanese coast guard frigate Hsun Hu No. 7 conducted a patrol mission with Palauan vessels.

Papua New Guinea
Papua recognises the PRC.

In 2005, Papua New Guinea, along with Fiji, supported Taiwan's wish to join the World Health Organization.

Solomon Islands

The two countries established diplomatic relations on 23 May 1983. A ROC consulate general in Honiara was upgraded to an embassy two years later. Since 2011, the Solomons' ambassador to the ROC has been Laurie Chan, a Solomon Islands national of Chinese ethnic background, and a former Solomon Islands Minister of Foreign Affairs who supported his country's continued relations with Taiwan.

After pro-Taiwan Prime Minister Manasseh Sogavare was ousted in a vote of no confidence in December 2007, and replaced by Derek Sikua, ROC President Chen telephoned Prime Minister Sikua, offering his congratulations and Taiwan's continued aid, and requested the Sikua government's continued diplomatic support. Chen also invited Sikua to visit Taiwan, which he did in March 2008. Sikua was welcomed with military honours by Chen, who stated: "Taiwan is the Solomon Islands' most loyal ally. [...] Taiwan will never forsake the people or government of the Solomon Islands." Solomon Islands has continued to recognise the ROC under Sikua's leadership.

In June 2019, secret negotiations with Australia were reported that involved the Solomon Islands reassessing if they wanted to switch recognition to the PRC with an internal deadline of mid-September to make a change or leave the status quo. In early September, they announced their intention to change recognition to the PRC. On 16 September, it officially broke its ties with Taiwan, switching its recognition to the PRC.

In June 2020 the Premier of Malaita Province, a critic of the switch in recognition, accepted rice from Taiwan as state aid. This was criticised by the national government, who called on him to respect the country's foreign policy.

Tuvalu

Tuvalu recognises the ROC; Taiwan maintains the only foreign resident embassy in Tuvalu, in Funafuti.

Tuvalu supports the ROC's bid to join the United Nations, and Taiwan has provided Tuvalu with mobile medical missions.

In 2006, Taiwan reacted to reports that the PRC was attempting to draw Tuvalu away from the ROC. Taiwan consequently strengthened its weakening diplomatic relations with Tuvalu.

In 2019—shortly after Kiribati and the Solomon Islands ended their relations with the Republic of China—Tuvalu reiterated their support for the ROC.

Vanuatu
Vanuatu recognises the PRC. In November 2004, Prime Minister Serge Vohor briefly established diplomatic relations with Taiwan, before he was ousted for that reason in a vote of no confidence.

Europe

Belgium
In 2020, Belgium's Chamber of Representatives passed a resolution of support for Taiwan. In 2021, the Flemish Parliament did the same passing a resolution in support of Taiwan with 117 votes in favor, no votes in opposition, and four abstentions. Flemish wind power companies Jan De Nul and DEME are involved in offshore wind farm development in Taiwan.

Czech Republic
 
Relations between the Czech Republic and Taiwan are significant. Jaroslav Kubera, President of the Senate of the Czech Republic, planned a visit to Taipei prior to his death, prompting threats of retaliation from China's Ministry of Foreign Affairs. Kubera's successor, Miloš Vystrčil, however, led a delegation to Taiwan that arrived in Taipei on August 31, 2020.

Denmark

On 9 January 1950, Denmark became one of the first European countries to recognize the PRC. While Denmark has continued to maintain unofficial relations with the ROC ever since, they have primarily been related to trade, culture, science and economic affairs.

European Union

The European Union has emphasized human rights in its relations with Taiwan. It is the largest source of foreign direct investment to Taiwan. The European Union has unofficial relations with Taiwan through the European Economic and Trade Office, which was opened on 10 March 2003. Taipei is one of the major trading partners via the European Free Trade Association, and a trading partner with the Eurozone. Taiwanese passport holders with a listed identity card number do not require a Schengen visa to visit the Schengen Area; reciprocally, the ROC has also eliminated visa requirements for citizens of all EU countries. EU-Taiwan relations were debated in the European Parliament. Sixteen EU member states have established offices in Taipei, along with some functional offices. Taipei Representative Office in the EU and Belgium is the unofficial diplomatic representation of Taiwan in the EU. Chinese Taipei is an observer in the OECD, which is headquartered in Paris, France. ROC's Civil Service Protection and Training Commission (CSPTC) and the Belgian Training Institute of the Federal Administration (TIFA) signed Memorandum of Understanding on 7 November 2014 for workshop attendance of public servants that highlighted leadership, innovation and conflict management, as well as global competitiveness strategies in Brussels. The EU rejects granting Mainland China market economy status.

Germany

In January 2021 the German government appealed to the Taiwanese government to help persuade Taiwanese semiconductor companies to ramp up production as a global semiconductor shortage was hampering the German economy's recovery from the COVID-19 pandemic. A lack of semiconductors had caused vehicle production lines to be idled leading German Economy Minister Peter Altmaier to personally reach out to Taiwan's economics affairs minister Wang Mei-hua in an attempt to get Taiwanese semiconductor companies to increase their manufacturing capacity.

Holy See (Vatican City)

Diplomatic relations between the Holy See and the Republic of China were established on 23 October 1942 and, with the presentation by Archbishop Antonio Riberi of his letter of credence to the President in 1946, the Holy See's Apostolic Delegation in China gained diplomatic status.Védrenne (2012), p. 42
 
The Holy See attempted to switch recognition to the CCP/PRC after the end of the civil war but were rebuffed and so ended up recognizing the KMT/ROC on Taiwan. The Holy See and the Republic of China have recognized each other ever since. The Holy See maintains negotiations with the PRC for recognition; however, the Holy See has given the ROC assurances that any negotiations with the PRC will not come at the expense of their relations with the ROC.

Italy

Until 1970, Taiwan, as the Republic of China, was represented by an embassy in Rome and a consulate-general in Milan. This was separate from the Embassy of the Republic of China to the Holy See, which, while located in Italian territory, remains accredited to Vatican City. This led to confusion in 1989 following the Tiananmen Square protests in Beijing, when Italians protested outside the embassy, believing it to be that of the People's Republic of China.

In 2014, Taiwan  decided not to participate in Expo 2015 in Milan after the Italian government proposed that it be represented as a corporate entity rather than as a country.

In 2020, Taiwan donated equipment and supplies to Italy as part of its medical diplomacy in response to the COVID-19 pandemic. Equipment donated included 15 respirators donated to WHO hospitals in the hard-hit Lombardy region in April 2020.

Latvia

Today bilateral relations between Latvia and Taiwan are positive, with established economic ties, a visa-free travel regime in place between the two nations and the support of some Latvian parliamentarians towards the participation of the ROC in organizations such as the World Health Organization.

Lithuania

In November 2021, Taiwan opened its representative office in Vilnius under the name of “Taiwanese” (the first under this name in the world), with the Lithuanian office in Taipei to open in Spring 2022. Subsequently, the People's Republic of China has imposed numerous unofficial economic sanctions on Lithuania, recalled its ambassador in Vilnius, Shen Zhifei, and demanded Lithuania recalls its ambassador in Beijing, Diana Mickevičienė.

The Netherlands

Netherlands–Taiwan relations go back to the 1600s when the Dutch East India Company set up a colony on Taiwan. In the modern era they are defined by the high degree of foreign direct investment which flows between the two countries and long lasting economic partnerships between Dutch and Taiwanese firms.

In 2020 the Netherlands' House of Representatives passed a motion supporting Taiwan's participation in international organizations.

North Macedonia
North Macedonia recognized the ROC in 1999, but switched in 2001 after the PRC imposed economic sanctions and used a rare veto on the UN Security Council to block peacekeeping efforts. In addition, North Macedonia was the first European country to sign a military agreement with Taiwan.

Slovakia

In 2021, the Foreign Affairs Committee of the National Council of Slovakia passed a resolution to support the attendance of Taiwan to the World Health Assembly.

United Kingdom

The United Kingdom's relations with Taiwan are conducted unofficially through the British Office Taipei and the British Council in Taipei.

After the Chinese Civil War and the retreat of the KMT government to Taiwan, the United Kingdom broke off diplomatic relations with the Republic of China and recognised the People's Republic of China from 6 January 1950. In September 1962, Taiwan opened a representative office in London under the name of the Free Chinese Centre, which was later renamed the Taipei Representative Office in the U.K. from April 1992. The United Kingdom opened a representative office in Taipei in 1993 under the name of the British Trade and Cultural Office, which was later renamed the British Office Taipei in 2015.

In September 2020, Foreign, Commonwealth and Development Office ministers stated that the UK hopes Taiwan is allowed to attend the World Health Assembly as an observer.

Overseas representation in Taiwan

Embassy

America

Oceania

Europe

Africa

Office

Africa

 (de facto state)

Asia PacificWest Asia

Europe

North America

Latin America

 Multilateral organisations in Taiwan 
 European Union Taiwan Office – European Economic and Trade Office

Free trade agreements
 Guatemala – July 2005 
 Honduras – May 2007
 Paraguay – February 2018
 Kingdom of Eswatini – June 2018

International organizations

Under pressure from the PRC, the ROC has been excluded from, or downgraded in, many international organizations. In other cases, ROC may retain full participation, due to the usage of names such as "Chinese Taipei" or "Taiwan, China".

Note

 Membership in 39 intergovernmental international organizations or their affiliated institutions
 Participate in 25 intergovernmental international organizations or their affiliated institutions as observers

Use of name
Participated in 37 intergovernmental international organizations with the name "Chinese Taipei".
Participated in 8 intergovernmental international organizations with the name "Republic of China".
Participated in 6 intergovernmental international organizations with the name "Taiwan".
Participated in 6 intergovernmental international organizations with the name "Taiwan (ROC)".
Participated in 5 intergovernmental international organizations with the name "Taipei, China".

Below is a list of such international organizations with the name by which Taiwan is known in each:
 Academic Council of the United Nations System (ACUNS) (participates as "Taipei Economic and Cultural Office in New York")
Association of Asia Pacific Airlines (AAPA) (included as Member Airlines)
Afro-Asian Rural Development Organization (AARDO) (participates as "Republic of China (Taiwan)")
Agency for International Trade Information and Cooperation (AITIC) (participates as "Separate Customs Territory of Taiwan, Penghu, Kinmen, and Matsu")
Amnesty International (AI) (participates as "Taiwan", ROC's Legislative Yuan debated and ratified the International Covenant on Civil and Political Rights and the International Covenant on Economic, Social and Cultural Rights on 31 March 2009.)
Asia Council (covered as "Taiwan")
Asian Federation of Biotechnology (AFOB) (participates as Biochemical Engineering Society of Taiwan (BEST))
Asia Indigenous Peoples Pact (AIPP) (NGO in Special Consultative Status with the United Nations Economic and Social Council, participates as Taiwan)
Asia News Network (ANN) (participates as The China Post)
 Asia-Pacific Association of Agricultural Research Institutions (APAARI) (participates by Council of Agriculture)
Asia/Pacific Group on Money Laundering (APG) (participates as Chinese Taipei)
Asia Pacific Regional Internet Conference on Operational Technologies (APRICOT)(participates as the economy of Taiwan)
Asian and Oceanian Stock Exchanges Federation (AOSEF) (participates as "Taiwan Stock Exchange Corp.")
Asian Forum for Human Rights and Development (FORUM-ASIA) (participates by Taiwan Association for Human Rights)
Asian Network of Major Cities 21 (ANMC21) (participates as Taipei City)
Association of Asian Social Science Research Councils (AASSREC)(participates as associate member of Academia Sinica – Taipei)
Association for Computing Machinery (ACM) (presents the Turing Award, participates as "Taiwan")
Association for Financial Professionals (AFP) (provide country-specific information as "Taiwan")
Association of Future Markets (AFM) (participates as "Taiwan Futures Exchange" (TAIFEX))
Association Montessori Internationale (AMI) (officially participates as "Taiwan/China", according to UN's definition of the territory of Taiwan and Taiwan, Province of China, which is separated from China)
Association of Southeast Asian Nations (ASEAN) (referred to as "Taiwan (ROC)")
Asian Productivity Organization (APO) (participates as Republic of China)
Asia-Pacific Economic Cooperation (APEC) (on the basis of the Memorandum of Understanding of 1991 and partaking APEC Business Travel Card scheme) (participates as "Chinese Taipei")
Asian Development Bank (ADB) (participates as "Taipei,China")
Asian Development Bank Institute (ADBI) (located in the Kasumigaseki Building, participates as Taipei, China)
Association for Information Systems (AIS) (participates as "Taiwan")
Association of Asian Election Authorities (AAEA) (participates as Republic of China (Taiwan))
Asia-Pacific Network Information Centre (APNIC) (participates as the economy of Taiwan by Taiwan Network Information Center)
Asian-Pacific Parliamentarians' Union (APPU) (held the 16th and 40th plenary meeting, participates as Republic of China)
Bank for International Settlements (BIS) (referred to as "Taiwan")
 Belmont Forum (Belmont Forum is a member of the Science and Technology Alliance for Global Sustainability, engaged by Ministry of Science and Technology (Taiwan))
Botanic Gardens Conservation International (BGCI) (participates as "Taiwan")
Boao Forum for Asia (BFA) (participates as "Cross-Straits Common Market Foundation")
Banco Centralamericano de Integración Economico (BCIE or CABEI) (participates as Republic of China)
British Council (administers international distance education exams and professional exams and on behalf of other international exam boards in Taiwan)
Caribbean Community (CARICOM) (with Member States of Belize, Haiti, Saint Kitts and Nevis, Saint Lucia and Saint Vincent and the Grenadines recognising Republic of China)
 Centre for Energy Environment Resources Development (CEERD) (in contact with as "Chinese Taipei")
Conservation International (CI) (listed in the annual Ocean Health Index)
Consumers International (CI) (participates as "Consumers Foundation Chinese Taipei")
Council for Security Cooperation in the Asia Pacific (CSCAP) (participates as "participant with individual capacity" in this "Track Two of Asia-Pacific Diplomacy")
Council on Tall Buildings and Urban Habitat (CTBUH) (participates as Taiwan, China)
Citizen Cyberscience Centre (CCC) (founded by United Nations Institute for Training and Research, participates by Academia Sinica)
Cumulus (recognised by UNESCO since 2011, participates as Taiwan(China))
Education International (EI) (participates as Taiwan)
Egmont Group of Financial Intelligence Units (participates as "Taiwan")
European Bank for Reconstruction and Development (EBRD) (has a long-standing cooperation with the EBRD as "Taipei China")
European Patent Office (EPO) (included in the Asian Patent Information as Chinese Taipei)
European Organization for Nuclear Research (CERN) (has scientific contacts as China (Taipei))
Food and Fertilizer Technology Center (FFTC) (participates as "Taiwan")
Free Access to Law Movement (FALM) (participates as Taiwan Legal Information Institute)
European Pharmacopoeia (participates as an observer by Taiwan Food and Drug Administration (TFDA) of the Ministry of Health and Welfare (Republic of China))
European Research Council (ERC) (a member of National Contact Points of ERC funding opportunities, participates as Taiwan)
European Southern Observatory (ESO) (participates the Atacama Large Millimeter Array/submillimeter Array (ALMA) project by Academia Sinica (AS) in Taiwan, and the National Science Council of Taiwan (NSC) (now (Ministry of Science and Technology (Republic of China))))
Fairtrade Labelling Organizations International (FLO) (participates as Fairtrade Taipei City)
Fédération Internationale de Philatélie (FIP) (in partnership with United Nations Postal Administration and Universal Postal Union, participates as Chinese Taipei)
Food and Agriculture Organization (FAO) (due to PRC's political pressure, participates in various subsidiary organizations as "China – Taipei", including Asia-Pacific Association of Agricultural Research Institutions, International Commission on Irrigation and Drainage, Asia and Pacific Seed Association)
FIABCI (participates as "Chinese Taiwan")
FreedomInfo.org (links the efforts of freedom of information advocates globally, included as Taiwan)
Freemasonry (participates as Grand Lodge of China)
Institute of International Education (IIE) (participates through the Fulbright program of Council for International Exchange of Scholars as Taiwan (Republic of China))
International Basketball Federation (FIBA) (participates as Chinese Taipei)
Fédération Internationale de Football Association (FIFA) (participates as Chinese Taipei)
Human Rights Watch (HRW) (involved as "Taiwan")
IFEX (spotlighted as Taiwan)
International Association of Horticultural Producers (AIPH) (participates as Chinese Taipei)
International Association of Public Transport (UITP) (participates as "Taiwan")
International Atomic Energy Agency (IAEA) (signed a trilateral agreement with the United States and the IAEA in 1971 stating that ROC continue to abide by the terms of the Treaty on the Non-Proliferation of Nuclear Weapons. While not a member of the IAEA, Taiwan does continue to subscribe to the IAEA's safeguards under two agreements, INFCIRC/133 and INFCIRC/158.)
International Association of Judges (IAJ) (as a professional and non-political international organization, that the association has consultative status with the United Nations (namely the International Labour Office and the U.N. Economic and Social Council) and with the Council of Europe, participates as "Republic of China (Taiwan)")
International Air Transport Association (IATA)(included as Taiwan/Chinese Taipei)
International Association of Universities (UAI) (founded in 1950, is the UNESCO-based worldwide association of higher education institutions, participates institutionally by Tamkang University and officially as "China-Taiwan")
International Bar Association (IBA) (participates section-ally as "Taiwan")
International Baccalaureate (IB) (There are 4 IB World Schools in Taiwan offering one or more of the three IB programmes; however, there currently there are no universities in Taiwan recognising IB.)
International Business Innovation Association (IBIA) (participates by Institute for Information Industry)
International Campaign to Ban Landmines (ICBL) (included as Taiwan CBL)
International Chamber of Commerce (ICC) (ICC participates in the activities of UNCTAD, including International Court of Arbitration, participates as Chinese Taipei)
International Commission of Jurists (ICJ) (affiliates by the Taipei Bar Association)
International Competition Network (ICN) (participates as Taiwan Fair Trade Commission)
International Congress and Convention Association (ICCA) (participates as Chinese Taipei)
International Council of Museums (ICM) (participates as Taiwan in the Board of ICM)
International Cospas-Sarsat Programme (Cospas-Sarsat) (participates as International Telecommunication Development Company (Chinese Taipei) (ITDC))
International Council on Social Welfare (ICSW) (participates as "Taiwan" in the ICSW North East Asia Region)
International Council of Women (ICW) (participates as Taiwan, Republic of China)
International Association for the Evaluation of Educational Achievement (IEA) (originally associated from the UNESCO, participates as "Chinese Taipei".)
International Council for Information Technology in Government Administration (ICA) (participates as "Taiwan")
International Council for Science (ICSU) (participates as China: Taipei, Academy of Sciences located in Taipei)
International Council of Graphic Design Associations (Icograda) (with international alliances of ISO, UNESCO's Global Alliance for Cultural Diversity, UNIDO and WIPO, participates as Taiwan (Chinese Taipei))
International Council of Societies of Industrial Design (ICSID) (participates as Taiwan (Chinese Taipei))
International Democrat Union (IDU) (participates as "Taiwan")
International Energy Agency (IEA) (included as a non-member country as "Chinese Taipei")
International Federation of Reproduction Rights Organization (IFRRO) (participates as Chinese Oral & Literary Copyright Collective Management Association)
International Institute of Administrative Sciences (IIAS) (participates as "Taiwan, China")
International Institute for Democracy and Electoral Assistance(International IDEA)(listed in the voter turnout data as Taiwan)
International Renewable Energy Agency (IREA) (referred to as "Taiwan" as IREA is co-hosted in the Steering Committee in the REN21)
International Press Institute(IPI)(participates as Taiwan (ROC))
Institute of Electrical and Electronics Engineers (IEEE) (participates as "IEEE Taipei Section" and "IEEE Tainan Section")
Institute of International Finance (IIF) (participates as Mega International Commercial Bank, "Taiwan, China")
International Federation of Agricultural Producers (IFAP) (participates as "Taiwan Provincial Farmers Association")
International Federation for Human Rights (FIDH) (participates as "Taiwan")
International Federation of Journalists (IFJ) (participates as "Taiwan")
International Labour Organization (ILO) (referred to as "Taiwan, Province of China")
International Life Saving Federation (ILSF) (referred to as "Taiwan, China")
International Maritime Organization (IMO) (referred to as "Taiwan, Province of China")
International Monetary Fund (IMF) (referred to as "Taiwan Province of China" and enhances ROC's sovereignty by indirectly channeling IMF through the Special Exchange Rate Agreement signed with the WTO)
International Network for Quality Assurance Agencies in Higher Education (INQAAHE) (participates as observer as "Taiwan")
International Narcotics Control Board (INCB) (referred to as "Taiwan Province of China")
International Olympic Committee (IOC) (participates as "Chinese Taipei" and bid for 2019 Asian Games by the Taipei City Government)
International Committee of the Red Cross (ICRC) remains unofficial relations with the ICRC and referred as the "Taiwan Red Cross Organization" under the category of Public Sources. (see page 476)
International Federation of Audit Bureaux of Circulations (IFABC) (participates as "Chinese Taipei")
International Institute of Business Analysis (IIBA) (Endorsed Education Provided by Maestro Project Management Consultants Co., Ltd)
International Law Association (ILA) (participates as "Chinese (Taiwan) branch")
International Police Association (IPA) (Invited to join as Foreign Associate Members (FAMs))
International Police Executive Symposium (IPES) (IPES is in special consultative status by the United Nations, contains World Police Encyclopedia, assigned as "Taiwan")
InterAcademy Panel (IAP) (participates as Academia Sinica, Taipei, China)
International Social Security Association (ISSA) (participates as "Taiwan")
International Telecommunication Union (ITU) (included in the National Numbering Plan as "Taiwan, China")
International Trade Centre (ITC) (participates as "Chinese Taipei")
International Trade Union Confederation (ITUC) (participates as Taiwan)
International Transport Workers' Federation (ITF) (participates as Taiwan)
International Union of Railways (UIC) (participates as "Taiwan (China)")
International Union of Forest Research Organizations (IUFRO) (participates as "China -Taipei")
Internet Society(ISoc)(participates as ISOC Taiwan Chapter)
International Organization of Securities Commissions(IOSCO)(works intensively with the G20 and the Financial Stability Board (FSB) on the global regulatory reform agenda, participates as Affiliate Members of IOSCO as Chinese Taipei)
International Union of Pure and Applied Physics(IUPAP)(participates as China: The Physical Society located in Taipei)
League of Historical Cities (participates as Tainan, "Chinese Taipei")
London Metal Exchange (LME) (the largest metal stock exchange in the world, approved Kaohsiung, Taiwan as a good delivery point for primary aluminium, aluminium alloy, copper, lead, nickel, tin and zinc and as the LME's ninth location in Asia on 17 June 2013.)
National Aeronautics and Space Administration (NASA) (participates as National Space Organization)
North Atlantic Treaty Organization (NATO) (referred to as "Taiwan")
North Pacific Fisheries Commission (NPFC) (participates as "Chinese Taipei" as a fishing entity)
Organisation for Economic Co-operation and Development (OECD) (participates as "Chinese Taipei" as an observer)
Organization of the Petroleum Exporting Countries (OPEC) (listed by economic cooperation as "Taiwan")
Pacific Islands Forum (PIF) (conducts regular dialogue as Taiwan/ROC Forum countries dialogue and issues diplomatic Joint Statement at each dialogue conference)
Pacific Economic Cooperation Council (PECC) (participates as "Chinese Taipei")
Property Rights Alliance (PRA) (indexed as Taiwan)
Public Services International (PSI) (participates as Taiwan)
Regional Fisheries Management Organisation (RFMOs) (participates as a fishing entity on the basis of United Nations Fish Stocks Agreement)
Reporters Without Borders (RWB) (included as "Taiwan" and first Asian Bureau opened in 2017 by RWB in Taipei City)
Sistema de Integración Centroamericana (SICA) (participates as Republic of China as the Extra-regional Observer)
Sustainable Development Goals (SDGs) (to replace the UN Millennium Development Goals once they expire at the end of 2015, included as Taiwan in the World Happiness Report of United Nations Sustainable Development Solutions Network)
SEACEN (participates as Central Bank, "Chinese Taipei")
Seoul Accord (participates as IEET(Chinese Taipei))
South East Asia Regional Computer Confederation (SEARCC) (SEARCC is an affiliate member of the International Federation for Information Processing, participates as Taiwan-Computer Society of Republic of China)
Study Group on Asian Tax Administration and Research (SGATAR) (participates as Chinese Taipei)
Summit for Democracy (participates as Taiwan)
Transparency International (TI) (to lend impetus on the formation of United Nations Convention against Corruption and OECD Anti-Bribery Convention, participates as "Chinese Taipei")
United Nations Academic Impact (UNAI) (participates as "China")
United Nations Children's Fund (UNICEF) (referred to as "Taiwan")
United Nations Commission on International Trade Law (UNCITRAL) (to be considered separately from PRC, but has not attained neither CISG status nor Model Law status
United Nations Conference on Trade and Development (UNCTAD) (referred to as "Taiwan Province of China")
United Nations Department of Economic and Social Affairs (UN/DESA) (assorted as "Taiwan Province of China")
United Nations Economic and Social Commission for Asia and the Pacific (UNESCAP) (over-sighted as "Taiwan Province of China")
United Nations Human Settlements Programme (UN–HABITAT) (included as "Taiwan Province of China")
United Nations Industrial Development Organization (UNIDO) (referred to as "Taiwan Province of China")
United Nations Institute for Disarmament Research (UNIDIR) (researched and referred as "Taiwan")
United Nations International Strategy for Disaster Reduction (UNISDR) (covered as Taiwan (China))
United Nations Office on Drugs and Crime (UNODC) (referred to as "Taiwan Province of China")
United Nations Research Institute for Social Development (UNRISD) (researched as "Taiwan Province of China")
United Nations Statistics Division (UNSD) (referred to as Taiwan, Province of China)
Universal Postal Union (UPU) (removed and excluded by UPU in 1972; "Taiwan's" Chunghwa Post continually providing the postal services as a non-recognised postal entity)
Unrepresented Nations and Peoples Organization (UNPO) (participates as "Taiwan")
Washington Accord (International Engineering Alliance) (participates as Chinese Taipei)
World Association of Girl Guides and Girl Scouts (WAGGGS) (participates as "Taiwan", also note that there is no national member of WAGGGS in PRC)
World Bank (WB) (covered separately in the Private Sector section, included as the economy of Taiwan, China)
World Confederation of Labour (WCL) (participates as "Taiwan")
World Economic Forum (WEF) (officially listed as "Taiwan, China")
World Energy Council (WEC) (participates as "Taiwan, China")
World Federation of Exchanges (WFE) (participates as "Taiwan Stock Exchange" and "Taiwan Futures Exchange") Under the umbrella of World Federation of Exchanges, MSCI includes Taiwan as MSCI Taiwan Index. In addition, London Metal Exchange is participated under London Stock Exchange in association with the World Federation of Exchanges in relation with Taiwan Future Exchange.
World Health Organization (WHO) (In the outbreak of Severe acute respiratory syndrome and with the concern of Disease surveillance, was invited as "Chinese Taipei" on the case-by-case basis. with its relations with the WHO being governed by a Memorandum of Understanding dated 14 May 2005 between the PRC and the WHO. The health insurance scheme in Taiwan is referenced on the WHO publication. Chinese Taipei is invited as an observer status in the World Health Assembly on the basis of Resolution 2758 and the condition of Cross-Strait relations. On 21 May 2018, 15 out of the 18 UN member states which then recognised the ROC (thus excluding Guatemala, Honduras and Palau) voiced support for the WHA observer status. This included Burkina Faso, which cut ties with the ROC only three days later, establishing ties with the PRC instead.
Worldwatch Institute (WI) (in partnership as Taiwan Watch)
World Intellectual Property Organization (WIPO) (not a signatory of the Patent Cooperation Treaty and Paris Convention for the Protection of Industrial Property, referred to as "Taiwan, Province of China")
World Medical Association (WMA) (participates as "Taiwan" by the Taiwan Medical Association)
World Meteorological Organization (WMO) (signed and ratified the Convention of the World Meteorological Organization on 2 March 1951, cited as "Taiwan region")
World Organisation for Animal Health (OIE) (participates as "Taipei (Chinese)")
World Organization of the Scout Movement (WOSM) (participates as "Scouts of China")
World Tax (founded by Euromoney Institutional Investor PLC, participates as "Taiwan")
World Trade Centers Association (WTCA) (participates as World Trade Center Taipei, World Trade Center Taichung and World Trade Center Kaohsiung)
World Trade Organization (WTO) (full membership as "Separate Customs Territory of Taiwan, Penghu, Kinmen, and Matsu" (Chinese Taipei) and delegated by the Permanent Mission of the Separate Customs Territory of Taiwan, Penghu, Kinmen and Mastu to the WTO in Geneva.)
World Veterans Federation (WVF) (participates as "R.O.C. on Taiwan")

International agreements

ROC is a party to major international treaties, including:
 Article 33 of United Nations Charter.
 Treaty of Commerce and Navigation with United States of America.
 Metre Convention (associate as "Chinese Taipei")
 Economic Cooperation Framework Agreement with PRC (signed between Straits Exchange Foundation and Association for Relations Across the Taiwan Straits – for ROC and PRC respectively and included the topic of direct flights, and with the improving relations between Mainland China and Taiwan, Taipei Economic and Cultural Office in Hong Kong and Taipei Economic and Cultural Office in Macau was officially launched in Hong Kong and Macau, also Hong Kong Economic, Trade and Cultural Office and Macau Economic and Cultural Office was opened in Taiwan)

Territorial disputes
The ROC claims islands in the South China Sea on the same basis as its claim to historical Chinese territory retaining the borders dated prior to the establishment of the PRC including Tibet and Outer Mongolia. Unlike its claims on the Asian mainland, however, the ROC actively pursues and defends some of its claims to these islands. These include all of the Spratly Islands, the Paracel Islands, Macclesfield Bank and Scarborough Shoal. These islands are administered by a number of governments around the South China Sea. The ROC also claims the Senkaku Islands, which are administered by Japan. Because ASEAN and the People's Republic of China did not invite the Republic of China to participate in the "Declaration on the Conduct of Parties in the South China Sea", the Republic of China did not recognize it.

The PRC, in turn, asserts itself as the sole legitimate government of China, and claims all territories administered by the ROC.

Specialized diplomacy

Culinary diplomacy

Taiwan emphasizes its night markets and the high rate of vegan eateries among other aspects of its culinary culture in an effort to promote the nation globally.

In 2010, Taiwan launched a £20m culinary diplomacy campaign.

Medical diplomacy
Taiwan's medical diplomacy began in 1961 with a team of medical professionals sent to Libya. In 2018 Taiwan set up a 2 million dollar healthcare fund for its Pacific island nation allies. Taiwan officially refers to most of its medical diplomacy as public health diplomacy.

Medical diplomacy has formed a key part of Taiwan's outreach to regional countries, especially in Southeast Asia. It is one of the five key components of the New Southbound Policy. Unlike medical diplomacy under previous programs under the NSP medical diplomacy is not focused on providing direct medical care or basic public health programs but on providing high-level professional skill transfers.

Epidemic prevention diplomacy

Local media has referred to Taiwan's medical diplomacy related to the COVID-19 pandemic as "epidemic prevention diplomacy". In March 2020 Australia and Taiwan agreed to exchange 1 million liters of Australian alcohol to be used in making hand sanitizer for 3 metric tons of Taiwanese nonwoven fabric to be used in making facial masks.

Transport and communications

Air links

The dispute over Taiwan's status affects the island's air links with the outside world, particularly Europe, North America and Australia.

For many years, Mandarin Airlines, a subsidiary of Taiwan's national airline, China Airlines (CAL), served many international destinations that CAL did not because of political sensitivities. However, in 1995 CAL dropped the national colours from its livery, and now flies to international destinations under its own name. Many countries' national airlines similarly set up special subsidiaries to operate services to Taipei, with a different name, and livery omitting national symbols. For example, British Airways' now defunct subsidiary, British Asia Airways, operated flights to London, KLM's subsidiary, KLM Asia, operated flights to Amsterdam, and Swissair's subsidiary, Swissair Asia, operated flights to Zurich, Air France Asie operated flights to Paris while Qantas had a subsidiary called Australia Asia Airlines, which operated flights to Sydney. Other countries' flag carriers, such as Germany's Lufthansa, operated flights to Taipei using an existing subsidiary (in Lufthansa's case, Condor).

Japan Air Lines established a subsidiary called Japan Asia Airways to operate flights to Tokyo. Before the completion of the second runway at New Tokyo International Airport (now Narita International Airport) near Tokyo, Japan, airlines from Taiwan were required to fly to Tokyo International Airport (commonly known as Haneda Airport) in order not to offend the airlines from the PRC that flew to Narita. All Nippon Airways, however, used an existing subsidiary, Air Nippon. With the implementation of a new Japan-Taiwan air agreement, JAL and ANA took over flight operations between Japan and Taiwan in April 2008.

Beginning July 2008, charter flights between mainland China and Taiwan, which were traditionally only allowed on special holidays such as Chinese New Year, were expanded greatly.

China has begun compelling foreign airlines with landing privileges in the mainland to identify Taiwanese destinations as if they were part of the mainland government, e.g. T'aipei CN instead of T'aipei TW.

Telecommunications
International dialling codes were assigned by the International Telecommunication Union (ITU), an agency of the United Nations, to its member states and their dependencies in the 1960s. Despite the Republic of China on Taiwan still being a member of the UN, and hence the ITU, other member states declared that "the only representatives of the people of China are the delegates to the ITU and its permanent organs appointed by the Central Government of the People's Republic of China". This led to the People's Republic of China being assigned the country code 86. Consequently, in the early 1970s, Taiwan had to be unofficially assigned a separate code, 886, although there was pressure from China to change this to 866. This had to be listed as "reserved", but in 2006, the code was formally allocated to "Taiwan, China".ITU Operational Bulletin, No. 870 – 4

Codes in the +86 6 number range have since been allocated to cities in Mainland China; for example, the area code for Shanwei is 0660. Consequently, calls from Mainland China to Taiwan require the international access code and country code 00886.

 See also 

China and the United Nations
Foreign relations of the People's Republic of China
Foreign relations of Hong Kong
Foreign relations of Macau
Freedom pineapples
International rankings of Taiwan
List of diplomatic missions of Taiwan
Milk Tea Alliance
Ministry of Foreign Affairs (Taiwan)
Visa policy of Taiwan
Wolf warrior diplomacy

 Notes 

 References 

 Further reading 

 Carpenter, Ted Galen. "The United States and the Taiwan Time Bomb." in Routledge Handbook of Asia in World Politics By Teh-Kuang Chang & Angelin Chang (Routledge, 2017) pp. 169–177. contents
 Chang, Gordon H. "To the nuclear brink: Eisenhower, Dulles, and the Quemoy-Matsu crisis." International Security 12.4 (1988): 96–123.
 Chiang, F. The One-China Policy: state, sovereignty, and Taiwan's international legal status (Elsevier, 2018).
 Copper, John Franklin. Taiwan: Nation-state or province? (7th ed. Routledge, 2019).
 Copper, John F. China Diplomacy: The Washington-Taipei-Beijing Triangle (Routledge, 2019).
 de Lisle, J. Taiwan: Sovereignty and participation in international organizations (Philadelphia: Foreign Policy Research Institute, 2011).
 Finkelstein, David. Washington's Taiwan dilemma, 1949–1950: from abandonment to salvation (Naval Institute Press, 2014).
 Green, Michael J. By more than providence: Grand strategy and American power in the Asia Pacific since 1783 (Columbia UP, 2017) online
 Kingston, Jeff. "Shadow boxing: Japan's para-diplomacy with Taiwan." in Japan's Foreign Relations in Asia (Routledge, 2018) pp. 227–243.
 Lee, Wei-chin. "US arms transfer policy to Taiwan: from Carter to Clinton." Journal of Contemporary China 9.23 (2000): 53–75.
 Lee, Shyu-tu, Douglas Paal, and Charles Glaser. "Disengaging from Taiwan: Should Washington Continue Its Alliance With Taipei?." Foreign Affairs (2011): 179–182. Online
 Lee, Wei-chin. Taiwan's Political Re-Alignment and Diplomatic Challenges (2018).
 Marinaccio, Jess. "Domestic and bilateral challenges to building relationality in cultural diplomacy: Tuvalu's performative cultural diplomacy in Taiwan." International Journal of Cultural Policy (2019): 1–16.
 Rawnsley, Gary D. Taiwan's informal diplomacy and propaganda (Springer, 2000).
 Rawnsley, Gary. "Soft Power Rich, Public Diplomacy Poor: An Assessment of Taiwan's External Communications." China Quarterly 232 (2017): 982–1001.
 Rigger, Shelley. Why Taiwan matters: Small island, global powerhouse (Rowman & Littlefield, 2013).
 Stolper, Thomas E. China, Taiwan and the offshore islands (Routledge, 2017).
 Sutter, Robert G., and William Oscar Johnson. Taiwan in world affairs (Routledge, 1994) excerpt.
 Tucker, Nancy Bernkopf. Strait talk: United States-Taiwan relations and the crisis with China'' (Harvard University Press, 2009).

External links 

 "Ministry of Foreign Affairs of the Republic of China (Taiwan)"

 
Cross-Strait relations